Marya Roxx (born Maarja Kivi on 18 January 1986) is an Estonian hard rock/metal singer-songwriter residing in Los Angeles. She is a former member of the Estonian girl band Vanilla Ninja.

Background
When the girl band Vanilla Ninja was founded in 2003, Kivi was selected as one of the solo singers and the bass player. She recorded two albums with the band, Vanilla Ninja and Traces Of Sadness. She left the group in mid-2004. She has a daughter, Dora-Liisa (born 2004), and son, Angus Martin (born 2012) with husband and former Vanilla Ninja manager Renee Meriste.

Solo career
Roxx teamed up with producer Kevin Shirley to record her debut album 'Payback Time'. It features musicians Paul Crook as a guitarist, Scott Metaxas on bass, Derek Sherinian on keyboards and Brian Tichy as the drummer. 21?! EP was released from this recording in 2008. It contains four songs, "'21?!'", "Oh Yeah", "Rebel", (all written by Roxx), and "Nothing Going On" originally recorded by Swedish band Clawfinger. Marya also wrote her solo album in Malibu with producer called Kevin Shirley aka "Caveman."

In May 2009, she performed as the warm-up act on the European tour of pop/rock artist LaFee. Roxx's band for her last performances was former Anthrax guitarist Paul Crook, Scott Metaxas and Jim Roe.

Her debut album, "Payback Time" was published on 5 October 2010. In January 2006 Marya's debut "Could You" was a success for her in many countries like Germany and Finland.

Discography

2008: Payback Time
2015: Land of Dreams  (EP)

Awards
"21?! Best Hard Rock Song Mavric Awards 2009 and "Rebel" Best Punk Song Mavric Awards 2009.

Tours
European Tour 2009
UK Tour 2009
Time To Run 2010 Tour
Rebel Wave 2010 Tour

References

External links
 Official Marya Roxx website
 Official Marya Roxx MySpace

1986 births
Living people
21st-century Estonian women singers
Estonian rock singers
English-language singers from Estonia
Women bass guitarists
Women heavy metal singers
Vanilla Ninja members
Estonian expatriates in the United States
21st-century bass guitarists